Living on Borrowed Time is the fifth full-length studio album by American crossover thrash band Sworn Enemy.  The album was released in the United States on May 13, 2014.

Track listing
Do or Die - 3:23
Hard Way - 2:00
Broken Hope - 3:23
Slipping Away - 3:16
No Apologies - 3:14
One Eye Open - 3:33
No Mercy - 3:41
Never Forget - 3:23
Stand and Deliver - 3:18
Nothing Changes - 2:58
Rise Above - 3:01

Charts

Credits 
Sal Lococo - vocals
Jeff Cummings - guitar
Matt Garzilli - guitar
Mike Pucciarelli - bass
Danny Lamagna - drums

References

2014 albums
Sworn Enemy albums